Almaty State Natural Reserve (Kazakh: Алматы́ мемлекетті́к табиғи́ қорығы́, romanized: Almaty memlekettіk tabigi korygy) is a  nature reserve in the Almaty Region, Kazakhstan, in the central part of the Trans-Ili Alatau ridge. In 1966, the “Singing Mountain” desert area was added to the reserve, but in January 1983 the natural monument was placed under the jurisdiction of the Kapchagai Hunting Sector. The area is located within the territory of the Altyn-Emel National Park.

Altitude belts
There are four high-altitude zones in the reserve:

 from  - coniferous forests of Shrenk spruce and Tien Shan spruce;
 higher there are alpine meadows with creeping juniper;
 above  - bare rocks and glaciers.

Flora and fauna 
In the reserve, the following fauna are common: in the Ili River valley - argali, gazelle, keklik, pheasant; in the mountains - maral, roe deer, brown bear, lynx, snow leopard, black grouse, mountain partridge, bearded partridge, Himalayan snowcock, bluebird, juniper grosbeak, woodpecker, nutcracker.

The reserve is home to over 1,300 plant species, including 112 species of trees and shrubs.

Mountains and glaciers
The highest point is Talgar peak within the Talgar massif, which is a powerful center of glaciation.

Peaks-giants stand out with a special harsh beauty: Bogatyr (N-4626), Corp (N-4631), Aktau (N-4686), Metallurg (N-4600). The impressive Talgar peak (H-4973) is the highest point of the entire ridge, well distinguishable from the foothill plain for many tens of kilometers. The peaks, "headed" by the Talgar peak, form a powerful Talgar knot, which occupies the entire middle part of the reserve. This is one of the centers of the modern glaciation of the Trans-Ili Alatau; the largest glaciers of the Northern Tien Shan are concentrated here: the Korzhenevskiy glacier and the Bogatyr glacier. The second is slightly inferior to it: length - , area - . The glaciers of Shokalsky, Grigoriev, Kassin, Palgov, Kalesnik and others are almost as extensive. The unique Talgar mountain knot is widely known among the country's climbers. For more than 40 years the alpine camp of the union significance "Talgar" has been operating here. In 1979, it was destroyed by a mudflow. Glaciers sparkle dazzlingly - Zharsai, Palgova, Grigoriev, etc. The Talgar section includes three gorges - Left, Right and Middle Talgars. The longest of them - the Left Talgar (more than ) - has, like most others, a direction from south to north. On the southern slope of the Trans-Ili Alatau there are protected gorges of South-Eastern Talgar, Southern Issyk and a number of other smaller gorges (Gubar, Kosbulak, Tamchi). In total, there are 160 glaciers in the reserve (with a total area of ) out of 466 known in the Trans-Ili Alatau.

Rivers and lakes
The river network is well developed. In the southern part, the Southeast Talgar, which originates from the Bogatyr glacier, and the South Issyk flowing into it, flowing from the Korzhenevsky glacier, stand out noticeably. Both rivers are very deep, especially during the warm season. Southeast Talgar and Zhangyryk, merging, give rise to the river. Chilik is the largest in the Northern Tien Shan. Chilik runs along the border of the reserve. The rivers are fed mainly by the seasonal melting of snow, firn fields and glaciers. The flood period begins in April and lasts throughout the spring and summer. The water discharge reaches  and more in July - August. On some hot days, as well as after heavy rains, the rivers turn into roaring frenzied streams, destroying the banks and carrying large stones, gravel and sand. In winter, the rivers are shallow, do not freeze, but they form powerful ice on bends and bends, and in narrow places - arched cornices of ice and snow between the banks. There are almost three dozen small (from ) alpine moraine and glacial lakes in the reserve. All of them lie in the beds of temporary streams and feed mainly on melt water. These lakes are usually very deep and accumulate significant amounts of water.

External links 
Peaks of Trans-Ili Alatau in Almaty region

References 

Nature reserves in Kazakhstan
Almaty Region